Vasilis Papageorgiou (Greek: Βασίλης Παπαγεωργίου, Thessaloniki, 1955) is a Greek-Swedish writer and translator. Since 1975 he lives in Sweden. He has translated books of numerous writers into Greek, such as W. G. Sebald, Willy Kyrklund, Eva Runefelt, Tomas Tranströmer (Collected poems, shortlisted for the Greek National translation prize 2005) and John Ashbery. He has translated into Swedish (with different colleagues) books of Odysseas Elytis, Kenneth Koch, W. G. Sebald, all the poems and fragments of Sappho (annotated edition) and an annotated collection with posthumous poems and prose of Konstantinos Kavafis. He has published essays, book reviews and literary texts in Greek, Swedish and British journals. He is a docent of comparative literature and professor of creative writing at Linnaeus University in Sweden.

His thesis Euripides’ Medea and Cosmetics is a post-structuralist analysis of the tragedy, in which Euripides, with the help of the radical otherness of Medea, criticises the Greek logos. His monograph on the poetry collection Mjuka mörkret by Eva Runefelt, Panta rei i Mjuka mörkret, and his essay collection Here, and Here: Essays on Affirmation and Tragic Awareness, are a series of critical analyses, which try to follow the use of logos as it exceeds the arbitrariness of logos within an affirmative and tragically aware openness. In his most recent theoretical and literary publications Papageorgiou studies how certain texts turn melancholia (which is generated by the paralysis of logos) into euphoria (which is created by a logos free from the arbitrariness of logos), and vice versa.

Publications

In Greece 

 Κρυπταισθησίες, 1979
 Σύγχρονοι Σουηδοί Ποιητές, 1988
 Παίξ’ το πάλι Χαμ , 1997
 Νυμφαίος θάνατος, 1998
 Tomas Tranströmer, Τα ποιήματα, 2004
 Ιππόλυτος Καλυπτόμενος , 2005
 Ευφορία , 2014
 Στιγμές θέρους, 2016
 Αϋπνία (Aypnia), 2017
 Κλαίρη Μιτσοτάκη: Μας παίρνει ο αέρας , 2017
 Θανάσης Βαλτινός: Ήλοι, ελιές, λέξεις, ήλιος, 2017
 Ωραίες ψυχές , 2019
Μοναχική ανθοφορία: Μέρες χωρίς κορώνες, 2020
Δημήτρης Δημητριάδης: Χώρα, σώματα, λέξεις, 2020

In Sweden 

 Euripides’ Medea and Cosmetics, 1986
 Konstantinos Kavafis, Den osannolika gryningen (with Lo Snöfall), 1993
 Boken om Malmö, 1994 (curator)
 Skeptikerns dilemma: Texter om Willy Kyrklunds författarskap, 1997 (editor)
 Handens blick (with Lo Snöfall), 1998
 Sapfo, Dikter och fragment (with Magnus William-Olsson), 1999 (enlarged pocket version 2006)
 Malmö City International, 2000
 En hand klär sakta (with Lo Snöfall), 2002
 Panta rei i Mjuka mörkret, 2003
 Hippolytos Beslöjad, 2006
 Ingen hand orörd (with Lo Snöfall), 2007

In the United Kingdom 

 Here, and Here: Essays on Affirmation and Tragic Awareness, 2010

References 

1955 births
Living people
Writers from Thessaloniki
Swedish writers
Greek emigrants to Sweden